Shukol-e Sahan Ali (also Romanized as Shūkol-e Şaḥan ʿAlī) is a village in Kushk Rural District, Abezhdan District, Andika County, Khuzestan Province, Iran. At the 2006 census, its population was 27, in 5 families.

References 

Populated places in Andika County